Divided States of America may refer to:

Books
 Divided States of America: The Slash and Burn Politics of the 2004 Presidential Election by Larry J. Sabato 
 The Divided States of America: What Liberals and Conservatives Get Wrong about Faith and Politics by Richard Land

Music
 The Divided States of America – Laibach 2004 Tour, DVD by Laibach 
 "Divided States of America" (The Script song), a song by The Script from the album Freedom Child

Television
 "Divided States of America", a two-part television episode of the PBS show Frontline 
 "Divided States of America", an episode of the television show American Race, hosted by Charles Barkley

Other uses
 "President of the Divided States of America", cover caption describing president-elect Donald Trump who was selected as the Time Person of the Year in 2016

See also
 The Disunited States of America, alternate history novel by Harry Turtledove
 The Divided States of Hysteria, comic book series by Howard Chaykin